A Subtlety (also known as the Marvelous Sugar Baby and subtitled an Homage to the unpaid and overworked Artisans who have refined our Sweet tastes from the cane fields to the Kitchens of the New World on the Occasion of the demolition of the Domino Sugar Refining Plant) is a 2014 piece of installation art by American artist Kara Walker. A Subtlety was dominated by its central piece, a white sculpture depicting a woman with African features in the shape of a sphinx, but also included fifteen other sculptures. These fifteen "attendants" to the sphinx were enlarged versions of contemporary blackamoors produced in China. 

The piece was installed in the Domino Sugar Refinery in the Williamsburg neighborhood of Brooklyn from May through July 2014. Although thematically consistent with Walker's earlier work, its scope and presentation were departures from her oeuvre. 

The project was commissioned by Creative Time and underwritten by New York-based real estate development company Two Trees, and was built with donated materials. The exhibition sparked conversations about the show's audience, the gentrification of Brooklyn, and the work's themes of race, sexuality, oppression, labor, and the ephemeral.

Development and presentation

Background

The Domino Sugar Refinery site is owned by real estate developer Two Trees, and the bulk of the facility had been slated for demolition as part of the redevelopment. Ann Pasternak, the president of Creative Time, reached out to Jed Walentas, both a Two Trees employee and a board member of Creative Time about a show on the site.  Creative Time approached Walker roughly a year before the exhibition. Creative Time selected Walker both because "[they] had been trying to get her to sign on to a public artwork for many years" and due to "the obvious historic connections between her work and the site". Walker was attracted to the project in part because of the plant's history and the evidence of the work done there, such as molasses still covering the facility's walls. 

Creative Time and Walker kept details about the project secret from the press. Production required several months of work and a team of more than 30.

Conception and construction
Walker first sketched a drawing of the sphinx, which was passed onto a production team. This team created a physical mock-up of the sphinx and uploaded a 3D version to manipulate using a computer. Upon completion, the sphinx was approximately 75 feet long and 35 feet tall, and was constructed from 330 polystyrene blocks donated by the Insulation Corporation of America. Domino Sugar donated roughly 162,000 pounds (approximately 80 tons) for the sphinx's "skin". The team used roughly half the donated sugar, and applied it to the underlying structure by hand and shovel. The polystyrene was recycled after the exhibit was closed, though the sugar was not.

The blackamoors were based on ceramic figurines found by Walker on Amazon.com and were enlarged and altered for the show. Five of the fifteen were made of solid sugar. The remaining ten, five holding baskets with bananas and five with baskets held on their backs, were first built from sugar as well. However, they collapsed under the heat, and were replaced with versions made of resin and coated in a layer of molasses. Each statue weighed between 300 and 500 pounds.

Sculptures
Walker is best known for her silhouettes depicting stylized scenes from the Antebellum South. Although thematically similar to earlier works, the sphinx and whole installation was a break with Walker's earlier work in terms of its scale. The name of the exhibit, A Subtlety is a reference to sugar sculptures used as decoration or food in aristocratic European households during the Middle Ages known as subtleties in English-speaking countries.

The sphinx evokes stereotypical depictions of the Southern Mammy archetype. Consistent with the mammy archetype, the sphinx appears to be overweight and wears a bonnet. Walker's choice to depict a mammy was in part inspired by a "Mammy memorial" once proposed for construction in the District of Columbia.

Exhibit
A Subtlety was installed in the refinery's Syrup Shed and was open to the public from May 10, to July 6, 2014 on Fridays, Saturdays, and Sundays. Entrance to the exhibit required signing a waiver due to the asbestos and lead found in the structure, which was inhaled by those attending. Editorials noted the overwhelmingly white makeup of the audience. Attendees were encouraged to post photographs to social media platform Instagram using the hashtag #karawalkerdomino.

Salome Asega and Sable Elyse Smith, New York-based artists, organized a visit to the site for people of color who might otherwise have felt uncomfortable in the space given the behavior of the audience and the lack of structured guidance by Creative Time. The gathering, dubbed "We Are Here" distributed informational pamphlets and stickers reading "We Are Here" to those participating.

After the end of the exhibit, the sphinx was disassembled in a process that took a week. Walker did not participate in the disassembly, and spent time at her home in Massachusetts after the show ended. One piece of the sphinx, the left hand, was retained and shown in November 2014 at Sikkema Jenkins, the gallery which represents Walker. According to Walker, the hand is stored in either “New Jersey or Long Island". It is also scheduled to be shown on the Greek island of Hydra in the summer of 2017, beginning June 20th.

Controversy 

A Subtlety was received with varying opinions.  Jamilah King, writing for Color Lines said "...it's reassuring that so many white people have a vested – or at least passing – interest in consuming art that deals with race. At the same time I found it unsettling to view art by a black artist about racism in an audience that's mostly white." This audience caused a major aspect of this controversial piece as they posted insensitive posts including "...jokes about the sphinx’s vagina or gag pictures where the subject pretends to pinch [the sphinx's] ass" as well as a general insensitivity by those in the audience not found at other sites commemorating tragedies, such as the September 11 Memorial. After the close of the exhibit, Walker said that she had anticipated such reactions.

Betye Saar stated she "felt the work of Kara Walker was sort of revolting and negative and a form of betrayal to the slaves,” in 1999 after staging a writing campaign against A Subtlety. In this campaign, Saar wanted to destroy and censor Walker's work due to its questioned morality.

References

2014 sculptures
Public art
Installation art
2014 in New York City
Black people in art
Sphinxes
Sugar
Sculptures of women in New York City
Molasses
Works_by_Kara_Walker